Andrea Carnevale  (born 12 January 1961) is an Italian former footballer, who played as a forward.

Club career
After playing for various Italian teams, Carnevale enjoyed notable success with Napoli from 1986 to 1990, playing alongside Diego Maradona and Careca, and winning two Scudetti, one Coppa Italia, and an UEFA Cup.

In 1990, he moved to Roma, but after 4 goals in his first five games he was suspended for a year for illegal drug use, alongside teammate Angelo Peruzzi. He spent two more years in Rome before playing three seasons in Serie B for Pescara (twice) and Udinese.

International career
Carnevale earned 10 caps and scored 2 goals for the Italy national football team between 1989 and 1990. He made his senior debut for Italy on 22 April 1989, in a 1–1 draw against Uruguay in an international friendly in Verona. He scored his first international goal in a 4–0 win over Hungary in Taranto on 26 April 1989, and his second in a 4–0 win over Bulgaria, held in Cesena, on 20 September later that same year. He was also later included in Italy's squad at the 1990 FIFA World Cup, where they finished third on home soil. Carnevale was a regular starter for the Italians in the run up to the tournament in friendlies and appeared in Italy's first two group games of the World Cup.

After being replaced by Totò Schillaci in Italy's opening game of the 1990 tournament with Austria, Carnevale watched on as Schillaci scored 2 minutes later. Carnevale started the next game against USA, but after he failed to score, he was once again replaced by Schillaci. This was his last game for Italy; following the tournament, he was no longer called up to the national team.

Carnevale also played for Italy at the 1988 Summer Olympics, where they finished in fourth place after reaching the semi-finals.

Honours

Club
Napoli
Serie A: 1986–87, 1989–90
Coppa Italia: 1986–87
UEFA Cup: 1988–89

International
Italy
FIFA World Cup third place: 1990

Orders
 5th Class / Knight: Cavaliere Ordine al Merito della Repubblica Italiana: 1991

References

1961 births
Living people
Sportspeople from the Province of Latina
Italian footballers
Italy international footballers
Olympic footballers of Italy
Footballers at the 1988 Summer Olympics
1990 FIFA World Cup players
Latina Calcio 1932 players
U.S. Avellino 1912 players
A.C. Reggiana 1919 players
Cagliari Calcio players
Catania S.S.D. players
Udinese Calcio players
S.S.C. Napoli players
A.S. Roma players
Delfino Pescara 1936 players
Serie A players
Serie B players
Serie C players
Doping cases in association football
Italian sportspeople in doping cases
UEFA Cup winning players
Association football forwards
Knights of the Order of Merit of the Italian Republic
Footballers from Lazio